Guido Andreozzi was the defending champion, but lost in the quarterfinals to Diego Sebastián Schwartzman.

Diego Schwartzman won the title by defeating João Souza 7–6(7–5), 6–3 in the final.

Seeds

Draw

Finals

Top half

Bottom half

References
 Main Draw
 Qualifying Draw

Copa San Juan Gobierno - Singles
2014 Singles
Copa